Toshinden 4 (Toshinden Subaru in Japan or Battle Arena Toshinden 4) is the fourth  and final installment of the fighting game series Battle Arena Toshinden. Unlike previous installments, it only saw release in Japan and the PAL region. It was released a total of three times in Europe; it originally came out on June 30, 2000, and was re-released on the Virgin Interactive white label range on April 12, 2001, and was re-released again by budget label Play It, on November 20, 2003.

Gameplay

Plot
Ten years after the events of Toshinden 3, Eiji Shinjo, who is now the new leader of an organization called the "Gerard Foundation", has organized a fourth Toshinden tournament which revolves around the gathering of four holy weapons that can be used to either save the world or destroy it. Eiji's old enemy, Vermilion, is after the four holy weapons for his own malevolent ambition and that many fighters from within the tournament, including Eiji's own nephew Subaru, find themselves getting caught from within the conflict itself. Along the way, Subaru is accompanied by Naru, an adoptive daughter of Eiji’s old friend, Kayin who debut as a child in the third game, now grown up and currently trying to find her adoptive father’s whereabout, following his disappearance.

A plot point introduced in this game focused on the Four Sacred Arms. Though seen in full since Battle Arena Toshinden 2, their relevance was never previously brought up. Each weapon bears a reference to one of the Chinese cardinal beasts, Byakko, Suzaku, Seiryu and Genbu. The weapons also seem to change appearance depending on the user. While the Byakko no tachi (White Tiger Fang) is usually seen as a rather plain katana, the Seiryuu no yari (Azure Dragon Spear) was a long leaf tipped spear while held by Mondo, yet altered to an ornate golden rod in the hands of Eos. As a purely cosmetic addition, when using a certain attack, an image of the beast associated with the weapon will display in the background.

Plotwise, it was said that when all four weapons were gathered together, they would bestow tremendous power on a person. Most characters in the game have their endings based around uniting the weapons and receiving the power of them. In some endings, they use this power to speak to a parent or loved one. However, Eiji's ending reveals the true nature of the power behind the weapons: It is the "Toshin", or god of fighting.

Characters
While all characters are brand new, Eiji, Naru and Vermillion returns since their last appearance in the third game.

Team 1:
Subaru Shinjo
Naru Amoh
Rook Castle

Team 2:
Puella Marionette
Lancelot Lakeknight
Fan Barefoot

Team 3:
Genma
Miyabi
Bang-Boo

Team 4 (Unlockable Characters):
Eiji Shinjo
Eos
Zero

Team 5 (Unlockable Character):
Vermilion

Regional differences
The PAL release of Toshinden 4 made a couple of graphical changes to the original Japanese release, aside from the renaming of the game; the plain string linking Rook's nunchuks was replaced with an electricity inspired effect. Bang Boo and Eos's warm up animations also had the ends cut resulting in a sudden jump in their animations.

Reception

The game was poorly received. Official PlayStation Magazine opined the "multiple game modes provide no cover for a lackluster fighting game".

References

External links

1999 video games
Multiplayer video games
Video games about ninja
PlayStation (console) games
PlayStation (console)-only games
Takara video games
Battle Arena Toshinden
Video game sequels
Video games developed in Japan